Golf was one of the many sports which was held at the 1990 Asian Games in Beijing Golf Club, Beijing, China between 24 and 27 September 1990.

Women's golf was included in the Asian Games program for the first time, with female golfer able to participate in two events, individual and team.

Medalists

Medal table

References 
 New Straits Times, September 24–28, 1990

External links 
 Olympic Council of Asia

 
1990 Asian Games events
1990
Asian Games
1990 Asian Games